Seleute is a village and former municipality in the district of Porrentruy in the canton of Jura in Switzerland.
Since January 1, 2009 it has been part of the municipality of Clos du Doubs.

References

Former municipalities of the canton of Jura
Clos du Doubs